Too Many Magicians is a novel by Randall Garrett, an American science fiction author. One of several stories starring Lord Darcy, it was first serialized in Analog Science Fiction in 1966 and published in book form the same year by Doubleday. It was later gathered together with Murder and Magic (1979) and Lord Darcy Investigates (1981) into the omnibus collection Lord Darcy (1983, expanded 2002). The novel was nominated for the Hugo Award for Best Novel in 1967.

The Lord Darcy character also appears in several other novellas and short stories by Garrett, but this is his only novel-length Lord Darcy story. Michael Kurland has written two further novels set in the Lord Darcy universe.

Plot introduction 
The novel takes place in 1966. However, it occurs in a world with an alternative history. The Plantagenet kings survived and rule a large Anglo-French Empire. In addition, around A.D. 1300 the laws of magic were discovered and magical science developed. The physical sciences were never pursued. The society looks early Victorian, though medical magic is superior to our medicine.

The book uses the conventions of a detective story. The protagonist is Lord Darcy, Chief Investigator for the Duke of Normandy. This Sherlock Holmes-like figure is assisted by Master Sean O’Lochlainn, a forensic sorcerer.

The novel is a locked room mystery, which takes place at a wizards’ convention. Garrett delights in puns. Analogues of Nero Wolfe, Archie Goodwin, James Bond  and Gandalf the Grey appear.

References

External links 
 

Lord Darcy novels
1966 American novels
Novels by Randall Garrett
Novels first published in serial form
Works originally published in Analog Science Fiction and Fact
Doubleday (publisher) books